Climaciella is a genus of wasp mantidflies in the family Mantispidae. There are about 10 described species in Climaciella, found in North, Central, and South America. Climaciella brunnea, a wasp mimic, is a common species found in Central and North America.

Species
These 10 species belong to the genus Climaciella:
 Climaciella amapaensis Penny, 1983
 Climaciella brunnea (Say in Keating, 1824) (wasp mantidfly)
 Climaciella cubana Enderlein, 1910
 Climaciella duckei Navás, 1915
 Climaciella obtusa Hoffman, 2002
 Climaciella personata (Stitz, 1913)
 Climaciella porosa Hoffman, 2002
 Climaciella rafaeli Calle Tobón et al., 2018
 Climaciella semihyalina (Le Peletier de Saint Fargeau & Audinet-Serville, 1825)
 † Climaciella henrotayi Nel, 1989

References

Further reading

External links

 

Hemerobiiformia